Diplocercidae is an extinct family of prehistoric coelacanth fishes which lived during the Devonian and Carboniferous period.

See also
 Serenichthys kowiensis (sometimes placed in this family)

References 

Devonian bony fish
Carboniferous bony fish
Prehistoric lobe-finned fish families
Devonian first appearances
Carboniferous extinctions